Grosscup is a surname. Notable people with the surname include:

Edward Everett Grosscup (1860–1933), American politician
Lee Grosscup (1936–2020), American football player and sportscaster
Peter S. Grosscup (1852–1921), American judge